Wojnów  is a village in the administrative district of Gmina Oleśnica, within Staszów County, Świętokrzyskie Voivodeship, in south-central Poland.

The village has a population of  250.

Demography 
According to the 2002 Poland census, there were 247 people residing in Wojnów village, of whom 51% were male and 49% were female. In the village, the population was spread out, with 31.2% under the age of 18, 36.8% from 18 to 44, 18.2% from 45 to 64, and 13.8% who were 65 years of age or older.
 Figure 1. Population pyramid of village in 2002 — by age group and sex

References

Villages in Staszów County